The Daughter of the Snows (also known as Snegurochka or La Fille des neiges) is a ballet in three acts and five scenes, with choreography by Marius Petipa and music by Ludwig Minkus. The libretto by Marius Petipa is based on the play The Snow Maiden by Alexander Ostrovsky, inspired by a Russian folk fairy tale about Snegurochka from the folklore collection by Alexander Afanasyev.

The ballet premiered on 7 January 1879 at the St. Petersburg Imperial Bolshoi Kammeny Theatre in St. Petersburg, Russia by the Imperial Ballet.

Principal dancers: Ekaterina Vazem (as the Snow Maiden).

Ballets by Marius Petipa
Ballets by Ludwig Minkus
1879 ballet premieres
Ballets premiered at the Bolshoi Theatre, Saint Petersburg
Snegurochka